is a male Japanese former international table tennis player.

He won a bronze medal at the 1997 World Table Tennis Championships in the men's doubles with Hiroshi Shibutani and three years later won another bronze at the 2000 World Team Table Tennis Championships.

See also
 List of table tennis players

References

Japanese male table tennis players
Living people
1967 births
Table tennis players at the 1992 Summer Olympics
Table tennis players at the 1996 Summer Olympics
Table tennis players at the 2000 Summer Olympics
Table tennis players at the 2004 Summer Olympics
Olympic table tennis players of Japan
Asian Games medalists in table tennis
Table tennis players at the 1994 Asian Games
Table tennis players at the 2002 Asian Games
Asian Games bronze medalists for Japan
Medalists at the 1994 Asian Games
World Table Tennis Championships medalists
Japanese expatriate sportspeople in China